Yuhhua may refer to:

Districts
Yuhua District, Changsha (雨花区), Hunan, China
Yuhua District, Shijiazhuang (裕华区), Hebei, China
Yuhua, Singapore a subzone region located in the town of Jurong East, Singapore
Yuhua Single Member Constituency, the constituency that governs the subzone region

Townships
Yuhua, Xiangyin (玉华乡), a townships of Xiangyin County, Hunan, China.

See also
Yu Hua (disambiguation)
Yuhua Hamasaki, Chinese-American drag queen